Rattihalli Nagendra Sudarshan (2 May 1939 – 8 September 2017) was an Indian actor and producer who had mainly worked in Kannada cinema. He had also acted in Tamil, Hindi, Telugu, and Malayalam films. During a career spanning more than five decades, he had acted in more than 250 films.

Personal life
R. N. Sudarshan was the son of veteran actor R. Nagendra Rao. His elder brother R. N. Jayagopal (died 2008) was a famous lyricist and eldest brother R. N. K. Prasad (died 2012) was a famous cinematographer. He was married to actress Shylashri.

Career
In 1961, Sudarshan was launched as lead actor in the Kannada film field at age 21 in Vijayanagarada Veeraputra, and he was the lead for over 60 films before appearing in villainous roles.

Sudarshan was honoured with the prestigious Dr. Rajkumar Lifetime Achievement Award of 2009–10.

Death
He died on 8 September 2017 from kidney disease, aged 78.

Filmography

Films

Kannada

Vijayanagarada Veeraputhra (1961)
Ananda Bashpa (1963)
Pathiye Daiva (1964)
Mangala Muhurta (1964)
Navajeevana (1964)
Chandrahasa (1965)
Suvarna Bhoomi (1968)
Kadina Rahasya (1969)
Lakshmi Saraswathi (1970)
Aaru Mooru Ombhatthu (1970)...Sripathi
Nadina Bhagya (1970)
Karulina Kare (1970)
Thande Makkalu (1971)
Naguva Hoovu   (1971)
Mareyada Deepavali (1972)
Havina Hede (1981)
Chanakya (1984)
Mooru Janma (1984)
Rudranaga (1984)
Khaidi (1984)
Prachanda Kulla (1984)
Kartavya  (1985)
Belli Naaga (1986)
Hrudaya Pallavi  (1987)...cameo
Brahma Vishnu Maheshwara (1988)
Kaliyuga Bheema (1991)
Shivanaga (1992)
Mata  (2006)
Mast Maja Maadi (2008)
Super (2010)
Dashamukha (2012)
Chaarulatha  (2012)
Pungi Daasa (2014)
Huccha Venkat (2014)
Uppi 2 (2015)...legislator

Tamil

 Sumathi En Sundari (1971)
Maria My Darling (1980)
Oomai Ullangal (1981) - "Thulir Vidum Kalam" - as a singer with Janaki
Pagadai Panirendu (1982)
Theerpu (1982)
Neethibathi (1983)
Sandhippu (1983)
Paayum Puli (1983)
Punnagai Mannan (1986)
Nayakan (1987)
Velaikaaran (1987)
Ulle Veliye (1993)
Ramanaa (2002)
Paarijatham (2006)
Chaarulatha (2012)

Malayalam
Jackpot  (1993)
Rudraksham (1994)

Television
Marmadesam -Ragasiyam as Rungarajan
Maya Machindra
Velan as Brahmarakshasan
Maragatha Veenai
Agnisakshi
My Dear Bhootham as Li Swan (Main Antagonist)

References

External links
 

1939 births
2017 deaths
Male actors from Karnataka
Male actors in Hindi cinema
Male actors in Tamil cinema
Male actors in Telugu cinema
Male actors in Kannada cinema
Male actors in Malayalam cinema
Kannada film producers
20th-century Indian male actors
21st-century Indian male actors
Film producers from Karnataka
Indian male film actors
Male actors in Kannada television
Indian male television actors
Tamil male television actors
Deaths from kidney disease